Gunjiya, also known as Gughara, Pedakiya, Karanji, Kajjikayalu, Somas, and Karjikayi, is a sweet, deep-fried dumpling that is a popular dessert in the Indian subcontinent. This delicacy is made using either suji (semolina) or maida (all-purpose flour), which is stuffed with a mixture of sweetened khoa (milk solids, also called mawa) and dried fruits. The dumpling is then fried in ghee to give it a crispy texture.

The earliest mention of gujiya dates back to the 13th century, when a jaggery-honey mixture was covered with wheat flour and was sun-dried. The preparation method of a typical gujiya/pedakiya is rather similar to that of a samosa, but the gujiya/pedakiya looks like an empanada. Shaped like a half moon, the gujiya or pedakiya is filled with a sweet mixture of grated and roasted dried fruits, khoa, grated coconut, and a hint of suji to lend it a grainy texture.

Gujias are particularly popular in the Uttar Pradesh, Rajasthan, Gujarat, and Bihar regions of India, where they are prepared during Holi and Diwali festivities. In Bihar, dry ones are called Pedakiya and are very popular, particularly during Chhath. There are two types of pedakiya made in Bihar: one with suji/rawa (semolina) and another with khoa. In suji pedakiya, suji is roasted in ghee with sugar, almonds, cardamom, raisins, and other nuts and then deep-fried in ghee. In khoa pedakiya, pure khoa is mixed with nuts and sugar and then deep-fried.

Similar dishes are found in several regional cuisines in India, such as Ghughra (Gujarati) in Gujarat, Karanji (Marathi) in Maharashtra, Somas (Tamil) in Tamil Nadu, Garijalu (Telugu) in Telangana, Kajjikayalu (Telugu) in Andhra Pradesh, and Karjikayi or Karigadubu (Kannada) in Karnataka. All of these dishes are fried sweet dumplings made of wheat flour and stuffed with dry or moist coconut delicacies.

In Vietnam, a similar dumpling is known as bánh gối or bánh quai vạc. It is made of wheat flour and stuffed with ground meat, mushrooms, vermicelli, diced vegetables such as carrots, kohlrabi, and jicama, boiled egg, slice Chinese sausage, or sweet green bean with coconut copra. In Goa, nevri or neuri (plural neureo) is a similar sweet prepared on the occasion of their festivals, such as Ganesh Chaturthi for Hindus and Christmas for Christians.

See also 
 Chandrakala (dessert), a similar dish
 Empanada, similar pastry in other countries

References

External links
 Traditional Gujia recipe

Uttar Pradeshi cuisine
Rajasthani desserts
Maharashtrian cuisine
Indian desserts
Cheese dishes
Indian cuisine